The striped panchax (Aplocheilus lineatus) is a species of killifish, of the genus Aplocheilus. An aquarium variant of this species with a more yellowish coloration is known as golden wonder killifish. The striped panchax inhabits fresh and brackish waters of India and Sri Lanka. It is found in streams, rivers, swamps, and paddy fields. It possesses a parietal eye which permits it to see prey insects and predators above it on the surface. A. lineatus can jump very well.

References

Aplocheilus
Taxa named by Achille Valenciennes
Fish described in 1846